A list of Samurai films released in the 2010s.

Western